Edna Savage (21 April 1936 – 31 December 2000) was a traditional pop singer in the United Kingdom.

Savage was born in Warrington, Lancashire, England.
She had two elder sisters. Her father was a landscape gardener; her mother an amateur singer. She left school at 15 (common in the UK in those days). At first she trained as a telephone operator, but after a few bands had her sing for them locally, she quit the telephone job to sing professionally.

She auditioned twice for the BBC before making her first broadcast, in 1954. She recorded a number of records, only one of which charted, "Arrivederci Darling" in 1956, which made it to No. 19 in the UK Singles Chart. In 1957 she participated in the UK qualifying heat for the Eurovision Song Contest. In addition to being briefly married to fellow singer Terry Dene, Savage married three more times.

She died at the age of 64.

Recordings
Data from:

References

Traditional pop music singers
1936 births
2000 deaths
People from Warrington
20th-century English singers
20th-century English women singers